An isogloss, also called a heterogloss (see Etymology below), is the geographic boundary of a certain linguistic feature, such as the pronunciation of a vowel, the meaning of a word, or the use of some morphological or syntactic feature. Major dialects are typically demarcated by bundles of isoglosses, such as the Benrath line that distinguishes High German from the other West Germanic languages and the La Spezia–Rimini Line that divides the Northern Italian languages and Romance languages west of Italy from Central Italian dialects and Romance languages east of Italy. However, an individual isogloss may or may not have any coterminus with a language border. For example, the front-rounding of /y/ cuts across France and Germany, while the /y/ is absent from Italian and Spanish words that are cognates with the /y/-containing French words.

One of the best-known isoglosses is the centum-satem isogloss.

Similar to an isogloss, an isograph is a distinguishing feature of a writing system. Both concepts are also used in historical linguistics.

Examples

Centum-satem isogloss

The centum-satem isogloss of the Indo-European language family relates to the different evolution of the dorsal consonants of Proto-Indo-European (PIE). In the standard reconstruction, three series of dorsals are recognised:

In some branches (for example Greek, Italic and Germanic), the palatals merged with the velars: PIE  "tremble (inwardly)" became Latin cupiō "desire" and  "hundred" became Latin centum (pronounced [kentum]); but  "interrogative pronoun" became quō "how? where?". They are known as centum branches, named after the Latin word for hundred.

In other branches (for example, Balto-Slavic and Indo-Iranian), the labiovelars merged with the velars: PIE  became Vedic Sanskrit kopáyati "shaken" and  became Avestan kō "who?"; but  became Avestan satəm. They are known as satem branches, after the Avestan word for hundred.

Since the Balto-Slavic family, the Indo-Iranian family, and the other satem families are spoken in adjacent geographic regions, they can be grouped by an isogloss: a geographic line separating satem branches on one side from centum branches on the other.

North-Midland isogloss (American English)
A major isogloss in American English has been identified as the North-Midland isogloss, which demarcates numerous linguistic features, including the Northern Cities vowel shift: regions north of the line (including Western New York; Cleveland, Ohio; lower Michigan; northern Illinois; and eastern Wisconsin) have the shift, while regions south of the line (including Pennsylvania, central and southern Ohio, and most of Indiana) do not.

Northwest Semitic
A feature of the ancient Northwest Semitic languages is w becoming y at the beginning of a word. Thus, in Proto-Semitic and subsequent non-Northwest Semitic languages and dialects, the root letters for a word for "child" were w-l-d. However, in the ancient Northwest Semitic languages, the word was y-l-d, with w- > y-.

Similarly, Proto-Semitic ā becomes ō in the Canaanite dialects of Northwest Semitic. Within the Aramaic languages and dialects of Northwest Semitic, the historic ā is preserved. Thus, an ancient Northwest Semitic language whose historic ā became ō can be classed as part of the Canaanite branch of Northwest Semitic.

Such features can be used as data of fundamental importance for the purposes of linguistic classification.

Isographs
Just as there are distinguishing features of related languages, there are also distinguishing features of related scripts. (For a discussion of writing systems, see The World's Writing Systems.)

For example, a distinguishing feature of the Iron Age Old Hebrew script is that the letters bet, dalet, ayin and resh do not have an open head, but contemporary Aramaic has open-headed forms. Similarly, the bet of Old Hebrew has a distinctive stance (it leans to the right), but the bet of the Aramaic and Phoenician scripts series has a different stance (in both, it leans to the left).

In 2006, Christopher Rollston suggested using the term isograph to designate a feature of the script that distinguishes it from a related script series, such as a feature that distinguishes the script of Old Hebrew from Old Aramaic and Phoenician.

Etymology
The term isogloss (Ancient Greek  ísos "equal, similar" and  glōssa "tongue, dialect, language") is inspired by contour lines, or isopleths, such as isobars. However, the isogloss separates rather than connects points. Consequently, it has been proposed for the term heterogloss ( héteros "other") to be used instead.

See also
 Dialect
 Dialectology
 Dialect continuum
 Cultural boundary
 Language border
 Joret line
 Sprachbund
 Uerdingen line

References

Bibliography

External links

An example of an isogloss in Southern England.
Beyond the Isogloss: The Isograph in Dialect Topography: A discussion of the shortcomings and oversimplifications of using isoglosses.
On Some Acoustic Correlates of Isoglossy: A humorous analysis of Russian isoglossy.

Dialectology
Historical linguistics